John F. Maloney (sometimes spelled Malony) (died 1918) was an Alaskan lawyer, businessman, and politician, including the first Mayor of Juneau, Alaska from 1905 to 1906.  He came to Juneau in 1885, and by 1900 owned part the Porcupine Trading Company, after the 1898 Porcupine Gold Rush, along with Jack Dalton and Ed Hanley.

Maloney is best known for being one of the founders of the Alaska Electric Light & Power (AEL&P), an important Juneau business since 1893.  He was also affiliated with the Treadwell Gold Mine, representing the mine's company in legal issues.  Maloney was the president of AEL&P from 1905 until his death.

External links
AEL&P's "exciting beginning"

1918 deaths
Alaska lawyers
American energy industry businesspeople
Mayors of Juneau, Alaska
Year of birth missing